The McLaren MP4/12 was the Formula One car with which the McLaren team competed in the 1997 Formula One World Championship. The chassis was designed by Steve Nichols, Neil Oatley and Henri Durand with Mario Illien designing the bespoke Ilmor engine. It was driven by Mika Häkkinen and David Coulthard.

Background and design

Summary 
Externally, the car was a more streamlined and refined evolution of the previous year's MP4/11, with engines supplied by Mercedes-Benz for the third year of the Anglo-German alliance. Testing was carried out with the cars painted in the traditional McLaren orange, before a striking new silver livery was launched to celebrate the team's new sponsorship deal with West, replacing the red and white of Marlboro that the team had used since .

Second brake pedal 
During the season, F1 Racing photographer Darren Heath noticed that the rear brakes of the McLarens were glowing red in an acceleration zone of the track. The magazine discovered through photos of the inside of the cockpit, that McLaren had installed a second brake pedal, selectable by the driver to act on one of the rear wheels. This allowed the driver to eliminate understeer and reduce wheelspin when exiting slow corners, dubbed "brake steer". Ferrari's protestations to the FIA led to the system being banned the following season at the 1998 Brazilian Grand Prix.

McLaren later designed a road car that shared a similar designation to the MP4/12: the McLaren MP4-12C, which also featured the "brake steer" system.

Racing history 
The car proved extremely promising and could have won at least seven races during the course of the season, but reliability proved troublesome, in particular that of the engine. The FO110E engine was replaced with the FO110F engine from the French Grand Prix, but the trouble happened frequently to either engine. This proved frustrating, especially after Coulthard won the first race of the season in Australia, McLaren's first win since losing Ayrton Senna and also Mercedes' first F1 win since the 1955 Italian Grand Prix.  The situation was exacerbated by Häkkinen retiring from three further races whilst in the lead - all from engine failures - including at the Nürburgring, where the team lost a comfortable one-two finish when both cars retired with identical failures within a lap of each other. Coulthard also lost a certain victory – at Montreal, with a clutch problem after a precautionary pitstop just a few laps before the race prematurely ended. However, Coulthard did manage to win again at Monza.

The team finally claimed the reward of a one-two finish at the season finale after the collision between Michael Schumacher and Jacques Villeneuve, although it was a contentious finish with many nodding to the fact that Patrick Head of Williams and Ron Dennis of McLaren had negotiations where Villeneuve would give up the lead if the McLarens made sure to steer clear from the troubled Williams. Regardless, this was Häkkinen's first win in F1 and was much celebrated by the F1 world which had been tipping him to win since he first out-qualified Senna in Portugal 1993. The win set him up with a good base to start his 1998 campaign, which he was able to win after a season-long battle with Michael Schumacher.

The team eventually finished fourth in the Constructors' Championship, with 63 points.

McLaren used 'West' logos, except at the French, British and German Grands Prix.

Complete Formula One results
(key) (results in bold indicate pole position)

References

AUTOCOURSE 1997-98, Henry, Alan (ed.), Hazleton Publishing Ltd. (1997)

External links

McLaren Formula One cars
1997 Formula One season cars